"Pale Blue" is the 11th single by Kenshi Yonezu. It was released on June 16, 2021. It reached #1 on the Japan Hot 100 list.

Charts

Track Listing

References

2021 singles
Kenshi Yonezu songs
SME Records singles